Malta–Palestine relations are the diplomatic relations between Malta and Palestine. Malta has traditionally held close and friendly relations with the Palestinian people ever since Malta's attainment of Independence on 21 September 1964. The Foreign Policy of Malta has consistently supported international efforts aimed at a peaceful and negotiated resolution to the conflict aimed at establishing a State of Palestine living side by side by the State of Israel in peace and security.

During Christmas of 1999, President of Malta (Emeritus), Guido de Marco attended the Bethlehem Midnight Mass (24-25 December 1999) and met with then President of Palestine, Yasser Arafat. In July 2008, the President of Palestine, Mahmoud Abbas visited Valletta, Malta and called on President of Malta (Emeritus), Edward Fenech Adami. In January 2019, President of Malta (Emeritus), Marie Louise Coleiro Preca made an historic two day visit to Palestine visiting the cities of Bethlehem and Ramallah and met with President Abbas. During Christmas of 2019, Former Prime Minister of Malta, Joseph Muscat attended the Bethlehem Midnight Mass ( 24–25 December 2019 ) and had meetings with the President of Palestine, Mahmoud Abbas and the Prime Minister of Palestine, Muhammad Shtayyeh.

Throughout the years, Malta and Palestine have sought to expand their bilateral relations through the intensification of cooperation in various sectors. Visits of respective Prime Ministers, Foreign Ministers, Ministers and Dignitaries to both countries take place on a regular basis.

The Republic of Malta has a representative office in Ramallah, Palestine, which is a diplomatic mission headed by a Maltese Head of Representative Office (Representative) resident in Palestine.

List of the Representatives of the Republic of Malta in Ramallah

 Mr Alan Bugeja (April 2009 - April 2012)
 Dr Mark Pace (July 2012 - September 2015)
 Mr Reuben Gauci (October 2015 - September 2020)
 Mr Franklin Aquilina (September 2020 to date) Incumbent

Resident diplomatic missions
 Malta has a representative office in Ramallah.
 Palestine has an embassy in Valletta.

See also 
 Malta and the Non-Aligned Movement

References 

 
Palestine
Malta